Antonio José Cavanilles (16 January 1745 – 5 May 1804) was a leading Spanish taxonomic botanist of the 18th century. He named many plants, particularly from Oceania. He named at least 100 genera, about 54 of which were still used in 2004, including Dahlia, Calycera, Cobaea, Galphimia, and Oleandra.

Biography
Cavanilles was born in Valencia. He lived in Paris from 1777 to 1781, where he followed careers as a clergyman and a botanist, thanks to André Thouin and Antoine Laurent de Jussieu. He was one of the first Spanish scientists to use the classification method invented by Carl Linnaeus.

From Paris he moved to Madrid, where he was director of the Royal Botanical Garden and Professor of botany from 1801 to 1804.

In 1804, Cavanilles was elected a member of the American Philosophical Society in Philadelphia.

He died in Madrid in 1804.

Selected publications
 Icones et descriptiones plantarum, quae aut sponte in Hispania crescunt, aut in hortis hospitantur..., Madrid, 1791-1801

See also
 List of plants of Caatinga vegetation of Brazil
 List of plants of Cerrado vegetation of Brazil
 List of Roman Catholic scientist-clerics

References

Further reading

External links

 Biography by the Australian National Botanic Gardens
 Malpighiaceae/Cavanilles
 Monadelphiæ classis dissertationes decem on the Internet Archive
 Chronophobia Scans of 160 plates from Monadelphiæ classis dissertationes decem
 Antonio José Cavanilles. Polymath Virtual Library, Fundación Ignacio Larramendi

1745 births
1804 deaths
People from Valencia
18th-century Spanish botanists
Pteridologists
Catholic clergy scientists
Botanical illustrators